Melpomena Dimitrova Karnicheva or Krničeva (16 March 1900 – 1964), popularly known as Mencha (Менча), was a Bulgarophile Aromanian revolutionary and terrorist of the Internal Macedonian Revolutionary Organization (IMRO). The wife of IMRO leader Ivan Mihailov, she is known for assassinating IMRO left-wing activist Todor Panitsa.

Karnicheva was born in Kruševo in Ottoman-ruled Macedonia (today in North Macedonia) to a Bulgarophile Aromanian family, with her great-grandfather being a Bulgarian priest. Her father worked in Sofia and Tsaribrod. Upon the crushing of the 1903 Ilinden–Preobrazhenie Uprising, Mencha and her mother moved to Bulgaria. In September 1918 she went to study in Munich, but returned to Bulgaria after the end of World War I.

Karnicheva joined the female Macedonian movement in Bulgaria and was part of Todor Panitsa's circle. She gradually got to be disappointed by his leftist views that advocated Comintern ties and collaboration with the Kingdom of Serbs, Croats and Slovenes, acts she believed would be fatal to the Bulgarian population of Macedonia. Karnicheva reoriented to IMRO's right wing; she joined the organisation on 15 March 1924 and took an independent decision to assassinate Panitsa, who was alleged by IMRO to have ordered the assassinations of Boris Sarafov and Ivan Garvanov and to have served foreign interests.

On 8 May 1925, Karnicheva assassinated Panitsa in Vienna's Burgtheater. The assassination was widely publicized across Europe. Mencha was arrested; her first words after the assassination were "He was a bad Macedonian". After a trial, Mencha was sentenced to eight years in prison, a minimum sentence by Austrian law that took her worsening health in consideration. Austria's Supreme Court declared her incapable of serving that sentence due to tuberculosis, kidney problems and rheumatism that she had suffered from since childhood; in late 1925, she was released and expelled from Austria.

Following her acquittal in court in Yugoslavia over her involvement in the IMRO, on 25 December 1926 Karnicheva returned to Bulgaria and married IMRO leader Ivan (Vanche) Mihailov, with whom she lived in exile in Turkey, Poland and Hungary after 1934. In May 1941 they settled in Zagreb, capital of the Nazi Germany puppet Independent State of Croatia; in 1944, they briefly lived in German-occupied Skopje. From 1945 to her death in 1964, she lived with Mihailov in Rome, Italy.

References

1900 births
1964 deaths
People from Kruševo
Aromanians from the Ottoman Empire
Bulgarian people of Aromanian descent
Aromanian revolutionaries
Bulgarian revolutionaries
Bulgarian people convicted of murder
Bulgarian assassins
Members of the Internal Macedonian Revolutionary Organization
Bulgarian emigrants to Italy
Bulgarian nationalist assassins
Bulgarian nationalists